Abano Glacier is located on the southeastern slope of Mt. Kazbek in the Kazbegi District of Georgia. Its meltwater is drained towards the river Terek.

See also
Glaciers of Georgia

References 
 Georgian State (Soviet) Encyclopedia. 1975. Book 1. p. 14.

Glaciers of Georgia (country)